Jonathon Patrick Webb (born 12 January 1992) is an English cricketer who plays for Warwickshire. Primarily a right-handed batsman, he also bowls right-arm medium.

External links
Jonathon Webb at ESPN Cricinfo

1992 births
Living people
English cricketers
Sportspeople from Solihull
Warwickshire cricketers
Leeds/Bradford MCCU cricketers